Phillip was an electoral district of the Legislative Assembly in the Australian state of New South Wales, in central Sydney and named after Arthur Phillip. It was originally created in the 1904 re-distribution of electorates following the 1903 New South Wales referendum, which required the number of members of the Legislative Assembly to be reduced from 125 to 90. It consisted of part of the abolished seats of Sydney-Phillip and Darlington. It was initially south of Liverpool Street, east of George Street and City Road, north of Cleveland Street and west of Elizabeth Street. In 1920, with the introduction of proportional representation, it was absorbed into Sydney. Phillip was recreated in 1927 and abolished in 1981 and partly replaced by Elizabeth. From 1973 to 1981 it included Lord Howe Island.

Members for Phillip

Election results

References

Phillip
Phillip
1904 establishments in Australia
Phillip
1920 disestablishments in Australia
Phillip
1927 establishments in Australia
Phillip
1981 disestablishments in Australia